Children's Book Award is a generic term that has been applied to:

 Caldecott Medal, Caldecott Medal, annual "most distinguished American picture book for children"
 Dorothy Canfield Fisher Children's Book Award from the Vermont Department of Libraries
 Guardian Children's Fiction Prize
 Golden Kite Award awarded by the Society of Children's Book Writers and Illustrators, since 2018, in six categories
 Jane Addams Children's Book Award
 Josette Frank Award, given by the Children's Book Committee at Bank Street College of Education, formerly known as the "Children's Book Award"
 Newbery Medal, awarded by the Association for Library Service to Children, of the American Library Association, was the first "children's book award"
 New Zealand Book Awards for Children and Young Adults, formerly "New Zealand Post Children’s Book Awards"
 Red House Children's Book Award, now "The Federation of Children's Book Groups Children's Book Award"
 Tomas Rivera Mexican American Children's Book Award

See also 
:Category:Children's literary awards